Anne-Marie Ericsson (born 28 April 1941) is a Swedish female curler.

She is a two-time  and three-time Swedish women's champion.

In 1978 she was inducted into the Swedish Curling Hall of Fame.

Teams

References

External links
 

Living people
1941 births
Swedish female curlers
European curling champions
Swedish curling champions